Ceylon is an unincorporated community in Wabash Township, Adams County, in the U.S. state of Indiana.

History
A post office was established at Ceylon in 1884, and remained in operation until it was discontinued in 1895. Ceylon was likely named after the British colony of Ceylon.

Geography

References

Unincorporated communities in Adams County, Indiana
Unincorporated communities in Indiana